Puffins is an animated television series targeted at children created by Danielle Maloni and Peter Nalli. It is a spin-off of the film Arctic Dogs (2019) and stars Johnny Depp. It follows five Puffins: Johnny Puff (Depp), Tic, Tac, Didi, and Pi who work for the wily walrus Otto. The show is produced by Iervolino Entertainment owned by Andrea Iervolino and Monika Bacardi, and Iervolino Studios based in Serbia. It consists of 250 episodes of five-minute episodes and was released on Apple TV and Amazon Prime Video in December 2020. A spin-off of Puffins, entitled Puffins Impossible, is slated for release and is to consist of 16 five-minute episodes with Depp to reprise his role as Puff.

Overview
Puffins is a 3D animated television series targeted towards children. It follows five Puffins: Johnny Puff, Tic, Tac, Didi, and Pi. They work for a wily walrus named Otto. The show promotes themes of race and gender equality and environmentalism.

Cast

Voice roles:
Johnny Depp as Johnny Puff.

Episodes
Puffins consists of 250 five-minute episodes.

Production
Puffins was created by Danielle Maloni and Peter Nalli. On 22 June 2020, it was announced Johnny Depp would voice Johnny Puff. Puffins was produced by Iervolino Entertainment based in Rome, Italy, and Serbian company Iervolino Studios. Iervolino Entertainment was founded by producer Andrea Iervolino and is owned by Iervolino and Monika Bacardi. Depp and Iervolino previously collaborated on Waiting for the Barbarians.

Puffins and similar series Arctic Friends originated from the film Arctic Dogs (2019). Iervolino and Bacardi purchased all spin-off rights of the animated characters from the film. On 1 December 2020, the show was released on Apple TV and Amazon Prime Video.

In February 2022, Depp received the Serbian Gold Medal of Merit from President Aleksandar Vučić for "outstanding merits in public and cultural activities, especially in the field of film art and the promotion of the Republic of Serbia in the world". Puffins and Puffins Impossible were produced or co-produced in Serbia. Also, Minamata another film Depp starred in was shot in the country.

Puffins Impossible
Puffins Impossible is a spin-off of Puffins which will consist of 18 five-minute episodes. It is being made by Iervolino Studios and Archangel Digital Studios. Nalli is the showrunner for Impossible. It is an action-adventure version of Puffins which follows the five Puffins gaining superpowers. Depp reprises his role as Johnny Puff.

According to local media reports, the series provided jobs in the creative centre in Belgrade, Serbia. The series received subsidies 206 million Serbian dinars (1.7 million Euros) in subsidies from Ministry of Culture and Information.

References

2020 animated television series debuts